Thomas Henderson (August 15, 1743December 15, 1824) was a United States representative from New Jersey. He served as acting governor of New Jersey in 1793.

Early life 
Born in Freehold in the Province of New Jersey, he attended the public schools and was graduated from Princeton College in 1761. He studied medicine and practised in Freneau, New Jersey and Freehold Township, New Jersey. He was a member of the Committee of Safety in 1774 and served as a lieutenant in the New Jersey Line in 1775. He was appointed second major in Col. Charles Stewart's battalion of Minutemen on February 15, 1776, and was a brigade major of the Monmouth County militia, April 19, 1776. He was major of Col. Nathaniel Heard's battalion, June 14, 1776, and later lieutenant colonel and brigadier major at Monmouth.

Politics 
Henderson was surrogate of Monmouth County in 1776, and a member of the provincial council in 1777. He was elected as a delegate to the Continental Congress, November 17, 1779, but declined to serve on December 25, 1779. He served in the New Jersey General Assembly from 1780 to 1784, and was a master in chancery in 1790. He was a member of the New Jersey Legislative Council (now the New Jersey Senate) in 1793 and 1794, serving as Vice President of that body, and in 1793 and 1794 he was Acting Governor of New Jersey. Henderson was elected as a Federalist to the Fourth Congress, serving from March 4, 1795, to March 3, 1797. From 1783 to 1799 he was a judge of the Court of Common Pleas, and was one of the commissioners appointed to settle the boundary line between New Jersey and Pennsylvania. He was again a member of the State Council in 1812 and 1813.

Death 
In 1824, Henderson died in Freehold; interment was in Old Tennent Cemetery, Manalapan.

References

New Jersey Governor Thomas Henderson, National Governors Association

1743 births
1824 deaths
Members of the New Jersey Legislative Council
Members of the New Jersey General Assembly
New Jersey militiamen in the American Revolution
New Jersey state court judges
New Jersey state senators
People from Freehold Township, New Jersey
People of New Jersey in the American Revolution
Politicians from Monmouth County, New Jersey
Princeton University alumni
American Presbyterians
People of colonial New Jersey
Burials at Old Tennent Cemetery
Federalist Party members of the United States House of Representatives from New Jersey
Federalist Party state governors of the United States
18th-century American politicians